Atypichthys is a genus of sea chubs native to inshore waters from Australia to New Zealand and the Kermadec Islands, with currently two recognized species:
 Atypichthys latus McCulloch & Waite, 1916 (eastern footballer)
 Atypichthys strigatus (Günther, 1860) (Australian mado)

References

 
Microcanthinae
Taxa named by Albert Günther
Marine fish genera